The Tuve landslide was a large landslide in Tuve, Gothenburg, Sweden on November 30, 1977. Some 67 houses were destroyed, killing 9, injuring about 60 and making around 600 people homeless. The slide began at 16.05 and lasted 5–6 minutes. The slide affected 270 000 square meters (27 hectares). About 600 people lived in the area; of these, approximately 200 were in the area at the time of the slide. About 100 needed help by rescue workers. It was the most severe landslide in the modern history of Sweden.

Close to one kilometer of the nearby road was destroyed. It is estimated that three to four million cubic meters of soil were involved in the slide and further would not have fertility to grow crops. The total economic cost of the slide has been estimated to 140 million SEK (15 million EUR, 22 million USD).

Cause
The slide was caused by heavy rain and an unstable slope.

Aftermath
After the slide it was concluded that many areas were built without a  proper prior geotechnical investigation. It was decided to chart up  the stability of built-up areas of municipalities.

References

Further resources
 Sveriges Radio P3 Dokumentär: Raskatastrofen i Tuve by Kristofer Hansson. First broadcast on 5 oktober 2008 18.03-20.00. . Radio documentary with interviews.

Landslides in Sweden
1977 in Sweden
Hisingen
1970s in Gothenburg
Landslides in 1977
November 1977 events in Europe